Castle Haven was a British soap opera, set around the residents of two Victorian seaside house that had been converted into a series of flats and bedsits. It was first broadcast on 4 April 1969, but cancelled just under a year later on 26 March 1970.

100 episodes were produced, but it is believed that only fifteen minutes of the series is still in existence; the rest were wiped after transmission, as per the (then commonplace) procedure of wiping videotape.

Main cast
 Sally James as Jo Mercer
 Roy Barraclough as Harry Everitt
 Jack Carr as Philip Mercer
 Kathy Staff as Lorna Everitt
 Gretchen Franklin as Sarah Meeks
 Jill Summers as Delilah Hilldrup
 Sharon Campbell as Sylvia Everitt
 Alan Guy as Dickie Everitt
 George Waring as Tom Meeks
 Sidonie Bond as Fiona Morris
 Robin Ford as Eric Waters
 Lala Lloyd as Mabel Waters
 Colin Rix as Ivor Davies
 Ann Way as Alice Davies
 John Comer as Sid Buller
 Ray Gatenby as Edward Pack

References

External links
 
 http://www.tvbuzer.com/tv-shows/Castle-Haven

Black-and-white British television shows
1969 British television series debuts
1970 British television series endings
British television soap operas
1960s British television soap operas
1970s British television soap operas